William Howard Casey (born 1955) is Distinguished Professor of Chemistry and Professor of Geology at the University of California, Davis. He has made major contributions in the fields of aqueous geochemistry and inorganic solution chemistry. He has in particular received international awards for his work on the use of heteronuclear ambient and high-pressure NMR spectroscopic and mass spectrometric techniques in elucidation the solution chemistry of discrete metal oxide clusters such as aluminum hydroxides and polyoxoniobates, and has been elected Fellow of the American Chemical Society and Fellow of the American Association for the Advancement of Science.
The mineral Caseyite is named in his honour.

Education
Casey obtained a B.A. from University of the Pacific (United States) in 1976, an M.Sc. from the University of California, Davis in 1980 and a Ph.D. from Pennsylvania State University in 1985. Following five years as a geochemist at Sandia National Laboratories he was appointed professor in Geology at University of California, Davis in 1991, and professor in Chemistry in 2005.

Awards
 Fellow, American Chemical Society, 2019
 Fellow, American Association for the Advancement of Science, 2017
 Clair C. Patterson Award, Geochemical Society, 2016
 Science Innovation Award The Science innovation award and Werner Stumm medal, 2010
 Fellow, Geochemical Society
 Fellow, European Association of Geochemistry

References

External links 
 

1955 births
Living people
American geochemists
American chemists
University of California, Davis faculty
University of the Pacific (United States) alumni
University of California, Davis alumni
Pennsylvania State University alumni
Fellows of the American Association for the Advancement of Science
Fellows of the American Chemical Society